Omid Hajili (Persian: امید حاجیلی, born 24 September 1983) is an Iranian trumpet player, pop singer, musician, composer and music arranger. He has released three albums, Allegro and Darkoob and Hajilitto.

Career
Omid Hajili was born in 1983 in Tehran. He started playing piano aged nine, and after he became eleven, he entered music school. After about three years of playing violin, he changed his musical instrument into trumpet and simultaneously he started to play percussion instruments and drama all by himself. He received his school certification in 1998 and then continued his studies up to bachelor's degree. He received a master certification in music from the art university.

Hajili was the professor of music department of Islamic Republic of Iran Broadcasting and now he is the professor of art and architecture department in Islamic Azad university. He is a professional trumpet player and has appeared on many music albums. He has 10 years background of playing with Tehran Symphony Orchestra, Tehran Philharmonic Orchestra, Seda-o-Sima Symphony Orchestra and others. He has collaborated with many singers as composer and editor, including Alireza Assar, Sirvan Khosravi, Mohsen Chavoshi (Man tormenting-track), Ali Lohrasbi, Khashayar Etemadi, Hami, Nima Masiha, Shahkar Binesh Pajooh, Mohamad Zare, and Jamshid Azizkhani. He also has been the orchestra leader of some pop music groups, such as Naser Abdollahi, Reza Sadeghi and one of the main members of Darkoob group.

His first album, Allegro, was a mixture of musical styles with a leaning to South America. It was released in December 2008 by Iran Gam. Hajili is very interested in Latin, funk and rhythmic songs as well as other styles.

Discography

Studio albums

2009: Allegro
2010: Daarkoob
2016: Hajilitto

Singles

See also
Persian pop music

References

External links
Official Website Of Omid Hajili

Omid Hajili on Spotify

1983 births
Living people
People from Tehran
Iranian songwriters
Iranian pop singers
Singers from Tehran
Iranian male singers
Musicians from Tehran
Iranian music arrangers
Persian-language singers
Iranian singer-songwriters
21st-century Iranian male singers